Claude Berri (1 July 1934 – 12 January 2009) was a French film director, writer, producer, actor  and distributor.

Early life
Born Claude Beri Langmann in Paris, Berri was the son of Jewish immigrant parents. His mother, Beila (née Bercu), was from Romania, and his father, Hirsch Langmann, was a furrier from Poland. His sister was the screenwriter and editor Arlette Langmann.

Career
Berri won the "Best Film" BAFTA for Jean de Florette, and was also nominated for twelve César Awards, though he never won. Berri also won the Oscar for Best Short Film for Le Poulet at the 38th Academy Awards in 1966, and produced Roman Polanski's Tess which was nominated for Best Picture in 1981.

Internationally, however, two films in 1986 overshadow all his other achievements. Jean de Florette and its sequel Manon des Sources were huge hits. In 1991, his film Uranus was entered into the 41st Berlin International Film Festival. Six years later, his film Lucie Aubrac was entered into the 47th Berlin International Film Festival.

In 2003, he was elected President of the Cinémathèque Française where he obtained enough state subsidies to cover the costs of its resurgence at its new site in the rue de Bercy.

Personal life
Berri's wife, Anne-Marie Rassam, suicided in 1997, jumping from the apartment of Isabelle Adjani's mother. Berri and Rassam had two children: actor Julien Rassam and actor and film producer Thomas Langmann.

Death
Berri died of a stroke, in Paris, aged 74. After his death, a group of nine works by Robert Ryman, Ad Reinhardt, Giorgio Morandi, Richard Serra and Lucio Fontana was promised to the Centre Pompidou in Paris in lieu of tax. But the heirs of the film director finally sold them through French art dealer Philippe Ségalot for about €50 million to Qatar.

Filmography

Director
1962: Le Poulet (short) (released 1965) Winner Best Live Action Short Film Oscar (also produced)
1964: Les Baisers (segment « Baiser de 16 ans »)
1964: La Chance et l'amour (segment « La Chance du guerrier »)
1967: Le Vieil Homme et l'Enfant (US title: The Two of Us) (also screenwriter)
1968: Mazel Tov ou le Mariage
1969: Le Pistonné
1971: Le Cinéma de papa
1972: Sex-shop
1975: Le Mâle du siècle
1976: La Première fois
1977: Un moment d'égarement
1980: Je vous aime
1981: Le Maître d'école
1983: Tchao Pantin (English title: So Long, Stooge)
1986: Jean de Florette
1986: Manon des Sources (US title: Manon of the Spring) — sequel to Jean de Florette (second half of the book L'Eau des collines)
1990: Uranus
1993: Germinal at the time, the most expensive French feature film ever made
1996: Lucie Aubrac
1999: La débandade
2002: Une femme de ménage (English title: A Housekeeper)
2004: L'Un reste, l'autre part
2007: Ensemble, c'est tout (English title: Hunting and Gathering)
2009: Trésor (also screenwriter and producer; died after four days of filming)

Producer

1962: Le Poulet (dir. Claude Berri)
1967: Marie pour mémoire (dir. Philippe Garrel) – associate producer
1968: Oratorio for Prague short documentary film (dir. Jan Nemec)
1969: L'Enfance nue (dir. Maurice Pialat)
1970: Le Pistonné (dir. Claude Berri)
1970: La Maison (dir. Gérard Brach)
1972: L'Œuf (dir. Jean Herman)
1973: Pleure pas la bouche pleine (dir. Pascal Thomas)
1975: Le Mâle du siècle (dir. Claude Berri)
1976: Je t'aime… moi non-plus (dir. Serge Gainsbourg) – (co-producer)
1978: Vas-y maman (dir. Nicole de Buron) (uncredited)
1978: Une histoire simple (dir. Claude Sautet)
1979: Tess (dir. Roman Polanski)
1980: Inspecteur la Bavure (dir. Claude Zidi)
1982: Deux heures moins le quart avant Jésus-Christ (dir. Jean Yanne)
1983:  (dir. Philippe de Broca)
1983: Banzaï (dir. Claude Zidi)
1983: L'Homme blessé (dir. Patrice Chéreau)
1983: La Femme de mon pote (dir. Bertrand Blier)
1983: Garçon !  (English title: Waiter!|) (dir. Claude Sautet)
1985: Les Enragés (dir. Pierre-William Glenn)
1985: Le Fou de guerre (English title: Madman at War) (dir. Dino Risi) (also French adaptation)
1987: Hôtel de France (dir. Patrice Chéreau)
1988: À gauche en sortant de l'ascenseur (dir. Édouard Molinaro)
1988: L'Ours (English title: The Bear) (dir. Jean-Jacques Annaud)
1988: Trois places pour le 26 (dir. Jacques Demy)
1988: La Petite Voleuse (dir. Claude Miller)
1989: Valmont (dir. Miloš Forman)
1992: L'Amant (English title: The Lover) (dir. Jean-Jacques Annaud)
1993: Une journée chez ma mère (dir. Dominique Cheminal)
1994: La Reine Margot (dir. Patrice Chéreau)
1994: La Séparation (dir. Christian Vincent)
1995: Les Trois Frères (dir. Didier Bourdon) and Bernard Campan (also actor)
1995: Gazon maudit (dir. Josiane Balasko) – (executive producer)
1996: Le Roi des aulnes (German title: Der Unhold; English The Ogre) (dir. Volker Schlöndorff) – (executive producer)
1997: Didier (dir. Alain Chabat)
1997: Arlette (dir. Claude Zidi)
1997: Le Pari (English title: The Bet) (dir. Didier Bourdon and Bernard Campan)
1998: Mookie (dir. Hervé Palud) – (associate producer)
1999: Astérix et Obélix contre César (English title: Asterix and Obelix vs Caesar) (dir. Claude Zidi)
1999: Mauvaise passe (dir. Michel Blanc)
2001: La Boîte (dir. Claude Zidi)
2001: Ma femme est une actrice (dir. Yvan Attal)
2002: Amen. (dir. Costa-Gavras)
2002: Astérix & Obélix : Mission Cléopâtre (English title: Asterix & Obelix: Mission Cleopatra) (dir. Alain Chabat)
2003: Le Bison (dir. Isabelle Nanty)
2003: Une femme de ménage (dir. Claude Berri)
2003: Les Sentiments (dir. Noémie Lvovsky)
2004: San-Antonio (dir. Frederic Auburtin)
2004: Ils se marièrent et eurent beaucoup d'enfants (dir. Yvan Attal)
2005: L'Un reste, l'autre part (dir. Claude Berri)
2005: Les Enfants (dir. Christian Vincent)
2005: Le Démon de midi (dir. Marie-Pascale Osterrieth)
2005: La Maison du Bonheur (dir. Dany Boon)
2007: Ensemble, c'est tout (English title: Hunting and Gathering) (dir. Claude Berri) 
2007: La Graine et le Mulet (dir. Abdellatif Kechiche)
2008: Bienvenue chez les Ch'tis (English title: Welcome to the Sticks) (dir. Dany Boon)

Writer
1967: Le Vieil Homme et l'Enfant, novel that was adapted by Berri for the film.
1968: Mazel Tov ou le Marriage
1969: Le Pistonné
1970: Le Cinéma de Papa
1972: Sex-shop
1975: Le Mâle du Siècle (English title: Male of the Century )
1976: La Première Fois
1977: Un Moment d'Égarement
1980: Je Vous Aime
1981: Le Maître d'École
1983: Tchao Pantin (English title: So Long, Stooge)
1986: Jean de Florette
1986: Manon des Sources (US title: Manon of the Spring)
1990: Uranus
1993: Germinal
1997: Lucie Aubrac
1999: La Débandade
2002: Une Femme de Ménage (English title: A Housekeeper)
2004: L'un Reste, l'Autre Part (English title: One Stays, the Other Leaves)
2007: Ensemble, c'est tout (English title: [Hunting and Gathering)

Actor

 Rue de l'Estrapade (1953) - Petit rôle (uncredited)
 Good Lord Without Confession (1953) - Le fils d'Eugène (uncredited)
 Le Blé en herbe (1954) - Le fils du forain (uncredited)
 French Cancan (1955) - Un jeune homme à l'inauguration (uncredited)
 Dangerous Games (1958) - Un jeune
 Asphalte (1959) - Garçon bande à Gino (uncredited)
 J'irai cracher sur vos tombes (1959) - David
 Les Bonnes Femmes (1960) - Le copain de Jane
 Zazie dans le Métro (1960) - Waiter (uncredited)
 La Vérité (1960) - Georges
 My Baby is Black (1961)
 Please, Not Now! (1961) - Bernard
 The Seven Deadly Sins (1962)-  André (segment "Avarice, L'") (uncredited)
 Behold a Pale Horse (1964)
 The Sleeping Car Murders (1965) - Un porteur (uncredited)
 Line of Demarcation (1966) - Le chef de famille juif (uncredited)
 Mazel Tov ou le Mariage (1968) - Claude
 Le pistonné (1970) - Le médecin militaire
 Le Cinéma de papa (1971) - Claude Langmann adulte
 Le Sex Shop (1972) - Claude
 Zig-Zag (1975) - Un client de Marie & Pauline (uncredited)
 Le mâle du siècle (1975) - Claude
 Le roi des cons (1981) - L'agent de police
 The Wounded Man (1983, directed by Patrice Chéreau) - Le client
 Stan the Flasher (1990) - Stan Goldberg
 Germinal (1993) - Narrator (voice, uncredited)
 La machine (1994) - Hugues
 Les Trois Frères (1995) - Le président du tribunal
 Didier (1997) - Type aéroport #1
 Un grand cri d'amour (1998, directed by Josiane Balasko) - Maillard
 La débandade (1999) - Claude Langmann
 Va savoir (2001) - Librarian
 Les Rois mages (2001) - Un passant (uncredited)
 Asterix & Obelix: Mission Cleopatra (2002) - Peintre Cléopâtre
 Les clefs de bagnole (2003) - Himself / Un producteur
 Happily Ever After (2004) - Le père de Vincent (final film role)

See also
1962 in film

References

External links

Obituary of Claude Berri
Claude Berri at the CinéArtistes 

1934 births
2009 deaths
Male actors from Paris
Best Adapted Screenplay BAFTA Award winners
Directors of Live Action Short Film Academy Award winners
Filmmakers who won the Best Film BAFTA Award
French film producers
French male screenwriters
20th-century French screenwriters
French people of Polish-Jewish descent
French people of Romanian-Jewish descent
Jewish French male actors
French male film actors
French male stage actors
Film directors from Paris
Burials at the Cimetière parisien de Bagneux
20th-century French male writers